Valverde is a province of the Dominican Republic. It was split from Santiago Province in 1959. It is in the northwestern part of the country. Its capital city is Santa Cruz de Mao.

It was created on 1959. It was a municipality of the Santiago province before being elevated to the category of province.

Municipalities and municipal districts
The province as of June 20, 2006 was divided into the following municipalities (municipio) and municipal districts (distrito municipal - D.M.) and the municipal Seat (distrito cabecera - D.C.) within them:
 Santa Cruz de Mao, head municipality of the province
 Ámina (D.M.)
 Guatapanal (D.M.)
 Pueblo Nuevo (D.M.)
Esperanza
 Boca de Mao (D.M.)
 Jicomé (M.D.)
 Maizal (M.D.)
 Paradero (M.D.)
Laguna Salada
 Cruce de Guayacanes (D.M.)
 Jaibon (D.M.)	
 La Caya (D.M.)

The following is a sortable table of the municipalities with population figures as of the 2012 census; the population figures for the municipal districts are included within their municipalities. Urban population are those living in the seats (cabeceras: literally, heads) of municipalities or of municipal districts. Rural population are those living in the districts (Secciones: literally, sections) and neighborhoods (Parajes: literally, places) outside of them.

For comparison with the municipalities and municipal districts of other provinces see the list of municipalities and municipal districts of the Dominican Republic.

Name
The province was named Valverde after José Desiderio Valverde, an officer of the Dominican army when the Dominican-Haitian War. Later, he was President of the Dominican Republic for one year (July 1857 - August 1858). He was from Santiago de los Caballeros.

Geography

It has  of the area of the Dominican Republic and it is ranked as the 28th (out of 31 plus the National District) largest province.

South of the city of Mao are the Sierra Samba (a chain of low hills) and part of the Cordillera Central mountain range. The highest mountains of the island are in the Cordillera Central but in the Valverde province there are only low mountains.

There are several important rivers that flow through the territory of the province. The most important river is the Yaque del Norte, that flows from east to west; the other rivers are all tributaries of Yaque del Norte. Other important rivers are Mao and Ámina that come from the Cordillera Central.

Location
The Valverde province is in the northwest part of the Cibao valley. It is bordered to the north by the Puerto Plata province, to the east and south by the Santiago province, to the southwest by the Santiago Rodríguez province and to the west by the Monte Cristi province.

References

External links
  Oficina Nacional de Estadística, Statistics Portal of the Dominican Republic
  Oficina Nacional de Estadística, Maps with administrative division of the provinces of the Dominican Republic, downloadable in PDF format

 
Provinces of the Dominican Republic
States and territories established in 1959